The Ring of Fire is the name given to a massive planned chromite mining and smelting development project in the mineral-rich James Bay Lowlands of Northern Ontario. The Ring of Fire development would impact nine First Nations, and potential developers are required to negotiate an Impact Benefit Agreement with these communities prior to development.

The Ring of Fire was named when the first significant mineral finds were made in the region, by Richard Nemis, after Johnny Cash's famous country and western ballad. Nemis, the founder and president of Noront Resources, was a lifelong fan of the singer. Prior to its discovery, Canada and the United States were compelled to rely on offshore sources for chromite, principally from South Africa.

By the fall of 2020, the Ring of Fire was considered "one of the largest potential mineral reserves in Ontario" with "more than 35 junior and intermediate mining and exploration companies covering an area of about "1.5 million hectares". Although the Ring of Fire crescent covers 5,000 square kilometres (approximately 1,930 square miles), most discoveries made by 2012 were within a twenty-kilometre-long strip. Ontario's Minister of Northern Development, Mines and Forestry Michael Gravelle called the region "home to one of the most promising mineral development opportunities in Ontario in more than a century". Tony Clement, Canada's Treasury Board President and the FedNor minister responsible for the Ring of Fire, claimed it will be the economic equivalent of the Athabasca oil sands, with a potential of generating $120 billion. Clement says the Ring of Fire represents a "once-in-a-life opportunity to create jobs and generate growth and long-term prosperity for northern Ontario and the nation". Challenges facing the development of the Ring of Fire mineral include lack of access to the remote region, infrastructure deficits such as roads, railway, electricity and broadband, First Nations land rights, and environmental issues in the James Bay Lowlands, the "third largest wetland in the world". Clement was looking to business, not the federal government, to invest "in power and transportation infrastructure to develop the deposit".

By 2019, the mining company with the most holdings in the Ring of Fire was the Canadian company—Noront Resources Ltd.—with palladium, nickel, platinum, and copper deposit in Eagle's Nest, and chromite deposits including Big Daddy, Black Thor, and Blackbird.

Ring of Fire overview
In May 2012, Cliffs Natural Resources announced a "$3.3-billion investment to build a chromite mine, transportation corridor and processing facility in northern Ontario's Ring of Fire that would lead to a new generation of prosperity in the north, with thousands of jobs and new infrastructure". Natural Resources minister Michael Gravelle announced that the smelter would be in Sudbury, Ontario.

On 26 April 2013, Tony Clement called the Ring of Fire the oil sands of Ontario. On 13 June 2013, Cliffs announced it would put its $3.3-billion project on hold pending results of negotiations between First Nations and Queen's Park.  Clement said that the Ring of Fire would bring "about a hundred years of mining activity that will spin-off jobs and economic activity for generations".

The Ontario government has called the Ring of Fire region “one of the most promising mineral development opportunities for critical minerals in the province”, citing the region’s long-term potential to produce, chromite, cobalt, nickel, copper, and platinum.

In May 2012, Cliffs Natural Resources announced its intention of investing $3.3 billion in Northern Ontario's Ring of Fire region, which would include a chromite mine, a transportation corridor and a smelter in Sudbury, Ontario. Cliffs initially invested $550 million to acquire and begin development. By 2013, Cliffs had suspended the project "after numerous delays and difficult discussions with the province [of Ontario] and the First Nations communities". Cliffs sold its assets to the smaller Canadian company, Noront Resources Ltd. for USD20 million.

The Ontario government and Premier Doug Ford have stated their enthusiasm and intent in connecting the Ring of Fire and Northern Ontario’s industries, resources and workers to the south of the province in order to “build up home-grown supply chains”. In its collaboration with First Nation partners, the Ontario government has said it is “continuing to make progress in a corridor to prosperity (roadway) to the 'Ring of Fire' region." Toronto-based consultant, Stan Sudol, added that the government should “accelerate road development into the Ring of Fire”, as it currently undergoes an Indigenous-led environmental assessments by Marten Falls and Webequie First Nations who support the mining project.

Transportation corridor

According to Northern Ontario Business article, Cliffs Natural Resources, the Ohio-based firm that held the majority share in Big Daddy chromite deposit, was seeking an easement through Ontario's Mining and Landings Commissioner on the KWG corridor to build their access road. The minority share partner in Big Daddy, KWG Resources, a Toronto-based junior miner, held a 30 percent stake and were also interested in the development of transportation corridor.

In February 2013, KWG had released the report it commissioned by the engineering firm Tetra Tech regarding the viability of building a railroad, instead of a road, to access chromite in the Ring of Fire. Big Daddy chromite deposit to CN Rail (CN) near Nakina, Ontario. According to KWG, KWG's 100 percent owned subsidiary, Canada Chrome Corporation, had "conducted a $15 million surveying and soil testing program for the engineering and construction of a railroad to the Ring of Fire from Exton, Ontario." The February 2013 Tetra Tech engineering firm report said that concluded that a railroad would provide better access to ore in the Ring of Fire, than a road.

By April 2013, Canada Chrome Corporation, had "staked a -kilometre-long "string of mining claims" which would eventually provide a transportation corridor from the Big Daddy chromite deposit to CN Rail (CN) near Nakina, Ontario. In an April 2013 interview, Moe Lavigne, VP of KWG Resources, a former Ontario Geological Survey geologist, said that the federal government would consider Tetra Tech's findings. Lavigne, said that they had staked mining claims to eventually build the railroad and make their stranded assets "viable." Lavigne said that "Ontario's Mining Act would safeguard his company's corridor claims."

In November 2013, The Globe and Mail, reported on the controversy over whether the province of Ontario, could afford a CAD$2.25 billion road the Trans-Canada Highway near Kenora to the Ring of Fire.

In the spring of 2016, engineers from China Railway Group Limited (FSDI), a Xian-based firm owned by the Government of China through the China Railway Engineering Corporation, and KWG's Moe Lavigne visited the Ring of Fire in Northern Ontario to explore a potential north–south route for a chromite ore-haul railroad from the Ring of Fire. KWG's Chinese partners feasibility study had concluded that the route that traverses the traditional territory of the Marten Falls First Nation (MFFN) to reach Nakina in northwestern Ontario, was a "viable alignment". China consumes approximately 60% of the world's ferrochrome production.

According to an April 2017 Northern Ontario Business article, KWG said it was "working towards" creating an "equal partnership" to develop the chromite deposit with one of the First Nation's communities, Marten Falls First Nation, whose traditional territory includes the Ring of Fire nickel and chromite deposits and would also be traversed by the proposed north-south railway. The five Ring of Fire mining companies began planning on extending partnership offers to other nearby communities such as Aroland First Nation and Webequie First Nation, the Northern Ontario Business said. Aroland First Nation signed a memorandum of understanding (MOU) with Norand on June 6, 2019, regarding the development of Norand's Eagle's Nest nickel and base metal deposit.

In April 2017, KWG also requested a guarantee of a billion dollars from Ontario's Ring of Fire Infrastructure Development Corporation (ROFIDC) to use as "consideration for project financing terms from Chinese lenders."

In May 2017, representatives from KWG and the Marten Falls First Nation (MFFN), made an official visit to FSDI headquarters in Xian, China. The FSDI feasibility study estimated that the capital cost of building the Far North railroad would be about $2 billion, says a June 2017 Northern Ontario Business article. The same article said that the proposed railroad would transport 10 million tonnes of chromite annually by 2030, potentially growing to a yearly volume of up to 24 million tonnes by 2040. To complete the project, KWG was seeking financing from both China and the Government of Ontario, including supply agreements with the Chinese stainless steel industry.

KWG CEO Smeenk proposed the creation of the James Bay & Lowlands Transportation Authority, which would be "similar to an airport or port authority". He said that the federal government should participate in the Ring of Fire development by creating James Bay & Lowlands Transportation Authority—"similar to a port or airport"— for the purpose of transporting ore from the Ring of Fire to Sault Ste. Marie where there is already a port and a rail line. The railway runs from Sault Ste. Marie to Hearst which is "half way to the Ring of Fire". Smeenk told Postmedia that in the current "political realities" and "regulatory environments", in order to extract minerals from the Ring of Fire and to avoid "political whims" from preventing the extraction of the minerals in the future, in was necessary to do "business with the United States."

KWG hosted a fundraising event on April 5, 2018, at Toronto's original stock exchange on Bay Street in support of the establishment of the Transportation Authority to facilitate the transport of chromite ore "from the Ring of Fire to a proposed KWG processing plant in Sault Ste. Marie." Invited guests included Premier Doug Ford, Maxime Bernier, and Chief Jason Gauthier, of the Missinabie Cree First Nation. KWG CEO Smeenk said that the transportation corridor would "ensure the viability" of the Algoma Central Railway, which is one of the goals of the Missanabie First Nation. The invitation for the April 5 event announced a discussion on the merits of "making ferrochrome in Sault Ste. Marie, Michigan for a new North American stainless steel joint-venture with Sault Ste. Marie, Ontario." Sault Ste. Marie's Mayor Christian Provenzano said in a March 22 news report, expressed concern that he was not aware of this joint venture, nor were their "partners in Sault Ste. Marie, Michigan." The news report said that "KWG is believed to be interested in partnering with the United States to take advantage of President Donald Trump's 'America First' approach to international trade."

In late August 27, 2019, in Sault Ste. Marie, Ontario's Minister of Energy, Northern Development and Mines (MENDM), Greg Rickford, said that the regional framework agreement negotiated in 2014 under between the province and the nine Matawa First Nations, had cost over $20 million and that funding had run out for the agreement in late 2018. Rickford said he was taking a more "pragmatic" approach with the goal of removing delays to projects, with the north-south corridor that at the top of the list. Rickford wants to work on a series of bilateral agreements with individual communities that would "not only could lead to road access to the mineral-rich James Bay lowlands, but can also connect by road, as well as add to the provincial power grid and expand modern telecommunications to, 'at least four, five Indigenous communities.'" In a CBC interview he said that, the transportation corridor would have "additional health and social and economic benefits that move beyond the more obvious opportunities of creating mines ... To the extent that Noront [Resources] or other mining companies could build mines on that corridor, then we have a great value proposition.". The mining company, Noront Resources, which holds the largest Ring of Fire claims, and Marten Falls First Nation issued a joint statement welcoming Rickford's announcement. Marten Falls is the proponent of an environmental assessment for the first stage of an access road connecting the community to an all-season road. On the same day, Noront announced that they had issued "300,000 shares to Marten Falls First Nation and 150,000 shares to Aroland First Nation" as part of their Project Advancement Agreement.

In March 2020, at the Prospectors and Developers Association of Canada convention, Ontario Premier Doug Ford and Minister of Indigenous affairs, Greg Rickford, met Marten Falls Chief Bruce Achneepineskum and Webequie First Nation Chief Cornelius Wabasse for a signing ceremony. This ceremony solidified the partnership between the two First Nations and the Ontario government, who now have the support of these First Nations to develop an all-season road infrastructure and move forward with the Ring of Fire developments.

In late 2021, it was reported that access to the Ring of Fire required 450 kilometers of new roads, which would connect many remote First Nation regions that are currently, air-access-only and do not have readily available access to clean drinking water, to Ontario’s provincial highway system. The provincial government has volunteered $1.6 billion of government funding for the proposed roads.

Marten Falls First Nation and Webequie First Nation are leading provincial and federal Environmental and Impact Assessments for their proposed Marten Falls Community Access Road and Webequie Supply Road projects. These projects have been respectively approved by the Provincial Environmental Assessment (EA) Terms of Reference in October 2021.

Environmental assessments
In 2011, environmental assessments by the Canadian federal and Ontario provincial governments began for Cliffs Natural Resources' proposed Black Thor Project and Noront Resources's Eagles Nest Project, with both companies volunteering "to make their projects subject to an environmental assessment under the Ontario Environmental Assessment Act (EAA) and are completing environmental assessments under the Canadian Environmental Assessment Act (CEAA)".

Natural resources development
On 25 October 2010, the Government of Ontario's Far North Act received assent and became law. The Far North Act is an Act With Respect To Land Use Planning and Protection in the Far North, providing "a legislative foundation to support Far North land use planning as a joint process between First Nations and Ontario. Ontario's Ministry of Natural Resources Ontario developed the Far North Land Use Planning Initiative recognising the Far North of Ontario represents "42% of provincial land area". The Hudson Bay Lowlands is the "third largest wetland in the world." Two-thirds of the Hudson Bay Lowlands is peatland, making it the "second largest area of contiguous peatland" in the world. There are 24,000 First Nation residents in 34 communities. The forests and peatlands in the Far North store 97 billion tonnes of carbon. The area filters Ontario's air, absorbing 12.5 million tonnes of carbon dioxide.

Government of Canada
On 12 November 2012, Tony Clement was appointed as the lead federal minister on the Ring of Fire and co-chair, with Minister of Aboriginal Affairs and Northern Development Bernard Valcourt, of the Federal Steering Committee (FCS), which represents 15 federal departments. Clement invited Ontario Natural Resources minister Michael Gravelle "to collaborate on projects, community visits, information-sharing, and to hold joint meetings". Aboriginal Affairs and Northern Development Canada (AANDC) led other federal departments and FedNor in the development of Action Plan for Supporting Community Participation in the Ring of Fire to help "position First Nations to benefit from proposed mining projects".

The Federal Action Plan's whole-of-government approach includes the creation of a one-stop shop, where working group leads, from existing federal working groups in the labour market, infrastructure, community health and well-being, business development and environment form the single point of contact with local First Nations, industry and the province of Ontario. A multi-ministry meeting of federal senior officials had already been organized in April 2012.

Until 2015, Greg Rickford was the Member of Parliament for the riding of Kenora, where the Ring of Fire is located, and the Minister of State for FedNor.

Action plan for supporting community participation in the Ring of Fire
February 2013 briefing notes for Clement warned that the Matawa First Nation communities were among the "most socio-economically challenged in Ontario, impacting their ability to meaningfully participate in large complex projects". Most of the "working age population in the Matawa First Nation communities have not completed high school". Three of the nine local Matawa First Nations were "under financial intervention (co-management)". Matawa First Nations lack "exposure to a development of this magnitude combined with low educational attainment and other factors suggests that the communities do not currently have the capacity to address the various issues related to the Ring of Fire".

The Action Plan noted that First Nations were interested in potential legacy impacts of Ring of Fire infrastructure, such as all-weather roads, links to the power grid and high-speed broadband Internet. Industry Canada's Broadband Canada was already laying 2,300 kilometers of fibre optic cable to 26 First Nations across the Far North, including the Ring of Fire.

Government of Ontario
In April 2010 the government of Ontario announced that it would open a large chromite deposit in the area to development.

Ring of Fire Secretariat: Resource revenue sharing with First Nations
In 2011, Ontario's Ministry of Northern Development and Mines created the Ring of Fire Secretariat, with Christine Kaszyckias as its coordinator, to develop "the chromite and other deposits in the Ring of Fire as quickly as possible and with due regard to environmental impacts and the needs of the Aboriginal communities within the region". It outlined strategies regarding First Nations partnerships, including resource revenue sharing, regional infrastructure planning, long-term environmental monitoring, community-based capacity funding, relationship agreements, land use planning, employment and income assistance, skills development, training and job creation, transportation and community infrastructure, and socio-economic and community development in response to concerns by industry and First Nations communities.

On May 8, 2012, Premier Dalton McGuinty wrote Prime Minister Stephen Harper, on the eve of Cliffs Natural Resources' announcement of the location of its ferrochrome processing facility, asking for federal government assistance "to engage First Nations in the region to help those communities benefit from this historic opportunity". Along with federal funds to improve First Nations education on reserves and for drug treatment programs, McGuinty asked for "a tripartite process".

Ontario Critical Mineral Strategy 
As part of Ontario’s Critical Mineral Strategy, the Ring of Fire is described as a transformative opportunity for unlocking multi-generational development of critical minerals that will contribute to the development of future technologies and green resources.

Development proposals
By 2012, there were 30,000 claims, 35 prospecting companies, and significant discoveries of chromium, copper, zinc, nickel, platinum, vanadium and gold; there were only two major development proposals, Noront Resources's Eagle's Nest Project and Cliffs Natural Resources. KWG Resources entered into a joint venture agreement with Bold Ventures (TSX:BOL) on its $5 million Koper Lake Project. Operator Bold Ventures was required to cease drilling activities from March 31, 2012, until April 13, 2013, to ensure the First Nations' permit was granted under the Mining Act, and a permit issued by a Director of Exploration from the Ministry of Northern Development and Mines was obtained. Probe Mines owned the entire Victory Project, which consists of "452 claims totaling 7,232 hectares and covers the interpreted southeast extension of the McFauld's Lake" and the Tamarack Project which "comprises 360 claims covering over 5,700 hectares of the McFauld's Lake in the Ring of Fire".

Noront Resources's Eagle's Nest Project
Its underground mine project is called the Eagle's Nest Project. To reduce heavy truck traffic, Noront is planning to build a buried -long slurry pipeline, using new technology safety features, from the site to Webequie Junction.

Environmental concerns listed in a Lakehead University 2012 report regarding Noront Resources's Eagle's Nest Project include pipeline leaks, a "a large edge effect", a "significant loss of biodiversity at local & regional level" from "linear constructions" such as roads. Despite state-of-the-art technology, environmental risks of underground pipelines in the wetlands, excluding the risk of leaks, include alterations of "hydrology, thermal regime, soil structure and vegetation of ecosystem".

The Eagle’s Nest Mine is expected to produce “3,000 tonnes of ore per day, which will be mined by underground methods and processed to deliver 150,000 to 250,000 tonnes of nickel-bearing concentrate per year." According to Noront Resources, citing its extensive discussions with local communities and other stakeholders, the company says its design will be the first mine to have all its tailings remain underground and “100% of process plant water will be recycled to minimize the discharge of effluents.” Further, it is reported to reach commercial production 3 years after permits are received and its mine life is expended to be 11 years, with the possibility of an additional 9.

Noront Resources and Marten Falls First Nations, 2003–2010
The Mining Act only allows exploration activities, not the construction of permanent structures. Marten Falls First Nations Chief Eli Moonias explained in 2010 that Noront Resources did not have "permits to construct landing strips on the string bog or roads to the nearby airstrip". "The two First Nations proposed that they should build and maintain the infrastructure to prevent further damage to the wetlands environment." Marten Falls First Nations Chief Eli Moonias described how over a seven-year period, Noront Resources "sunk machines here and they have done outrageous acts here". In the fall of 2009, the companies "used a helicopter to break ice here with a log". On February 3, 2010, Noront Resources Ltd. was trying to build a "[landing] strip here on the string bog". In January 2010, Chief Eli Moonias, Webequie Chief Cornelius Wabasse, and community members set up a blockade on the landing strips at Koper and McFaulds Lakes. Martens Falls and Webequie First Nations ended their blockade on March 19, 2010, with the admonition that they would resume the action if their concerns were not addressed by Noront within six months. Although the protest ended, Noront continued to use the frozen lakes as landing strips until break-up in 2010. Chief Eli Moonias expressed environmental concerns over "sewage, grey-water, oil spills and road clearing" over the seven-year period.

Noront Sells to Wyloo Metals 
In January 2021, the Australian company Wyloo Metals, announced its intent to acquire a controlling interest in Noront Resources.  Wyloo’s offer of $0.70 a share (CAD), trumped the competing offer of $0.55 (CAD) a share made by BHP group. In March 2022, Noront Resources shareholders, with a 98.9 per cent majority, approved the sale of the Toronto junior miner's mineral assets in the North to Wyloo Metals, for $616.9 million.

The head of the company, Luca Giacovazzi, noted that de-carbonizing the economy is a priority for Wyloo, stating that the company “started spending a lot of time looking at things like electric vehicles and batteries, and that sort of led us down the path of nickel.”  The metals company will commit $25 million in a feasibility study to look into building battery material in Ontario, as well as targeting $100 million in contracts with Indigenous communities to create jobs in communities and promising training for Indigenous workers.

Cliffs acquires Freewest Resources Canada Black Thor 2009
Cliffs Natural Resources, of Cleveland, Ohio, originally had an "ambitious timetable for developing the Black Thor chromite deposit", hoping to complete permits and environmental assessment approvals by the end of 2013 (MRI). In September 2003, a junior company, Freewest Resources Canada, began exploring Black Thor using airborne geophysics and ground geophysics. In October 2009, Noront Resources (NOT-V) made a hostile takeover bid for Freewest Resources (FWR-V). In November 2009, Cliffs Natural Resources (CLF-N), the world's largest iron ore pellet supplier, purchased Freewest Resources' share of the chromite-rich "high-grade Black Thor, Black Label and Big Daddy deposits in the remote "Ring of Fire" metals" for $240 million. In November 2009, Joseph Carrabba, Cliffs' president and CEO, claimed the "world-class deposits" had the "potential to support an open pit mine producing 1 to 2 million tonnes per year for more than thirty years". Carrabba announced that the ore would be "further processed into 400,000–800,000 tonnes of ferrochrome". The purchase was finalized in 2010.

According to Carrabba the area of the Ring of Fire that Cliffs acquired in 2009 represents one of the "premier chromite deposits in the world. Chromite is smelted to produce ferrochrome which is used globally in the production of stainless steel and is categorized as a strategic metal resource by many countries.

In May 2012, Cliffs announced a "$3.3-billion investment to build a chromite mine, transportation corridor and processing facility in northern Ontario's Ring of Fire that would lead to a new generation of prosperity in the north, with thousands of jobs and new infrastructure". Cliffs announced that its ferrochrome smelter would be in the Sudbury area in Ontario.

However, by 13 June, the Cleveland-based Cliffs Natural Resources Inc., one of the world’s leading mining companies, announced through Bill Boor, senior vice-president for Global Ferroalloys, a division of Cliffs, that it would put its $3.3-billion project, including the Comprehensive Assessment, on hold for one year pending results of negotiations between First Nations and Queen's Park.

First Nations and the Ring of Fire
Section 35 of the Constitution Act, 1982 forces the two companies to negotiate an impact benefit agreement with the nine First Nations that would "include certain assurances, including guarantees that a certain number of jobs will go to First Nations workers".  The three First Nations most profoundly impacted by the two projects are Marten Falls First Nation, Webequie First Nation and Neskantaga First Nation. Others on the edge of the Ring of Fire include Constance Lake First Nation (Chief Roger Wesley), Nibinamik First Nation, Aroland First Nation, Long Lake 58 First Nation, Ginoogaming First Nation, Eabametoong First Nation, Mishkeegogamang First Nation, and Constance Lake First Nation.

In May 2011, Matawa Chiefs and their communities called for a Joint Environmental Assessment (EA) Review Panel.

On October 13, 2011, the Canadian Environmental Assessment Agency (CEAA) proceeded with a Comprehensive Study Environmental Assessment that favours the mining industry without First Nations participation.

On October 20, 2011, Matawa First Nations removed its support for the Ring of Fire development unless the federal government agreed to a joint review panel Environmental Assessment process that would allow First Nations communities in the area to have a voice in the assessment. In May 2019 Noront Resources announced that their ferrochrome smelter to process chromite extracted from the Ring of Fire in northwestern Ontario, would be located in Sault Ste. Marie as a home for its. However, $60-billion Ring of Fire, a project, has been stalled as the newly-elected Ford administration has ended all negotiations with the nine Matawa First Nations in whose territory the Ring of Fire is located. The goodwill that stemmed from the 2014 regional framework agreement between the province of Ontario and the Matawa tribal council had quickly "evaporated" by 2018, according to Elizabeth Atlookan, Eabametoong First Nation Chief as the newly elected Conservative government worked "to "divide and conquer" by moving forward with projects, like road construction, in a piecemeal fashion, absent consultation with all Matawa nations."

On June 12, 2012, Webequie First Nation Chief Cornelius Wabasse and Minister of Northern Development and Mines Rick Bartolucci signed an agreement that "commits Ontario to providing social, community and economic development supports for Webequie to help facilitate the community's involvement in the Ring of Fire". They "will work together on regional environmental monitoring and regional infrastructure planning".

On February 4, 2013, Tony Clement acknowledged that the nine first First Nations on and off-reserve in the Ring of Fire area are some of the "most socioeconomically disadvantaged communities in all of Canada".

In an interview with CBC on 27 June 2013, Les Louttit, the deputy grand chief of the Nishnawbe Aski Nation, the group that represents the nine First Nations, argued that serious problems have been neglected for decades. Two to three years is not enough time for skills training to train locals for construction jobs, for example. Louttit noted the gap in First Nations high school and post-secondary education that has existed for many years. Anja Jeffrey, director of the Centre for the North at the Conference Board of Canada, stressed traditional hunting as one of the key issues.

In 2015, APTN partnered with Mushkeg Media (ROF) Inc. and ABF Ring of Fire Inc. to release a six-part Ring of Fire TV series and digital media project to help be a source of knowledge and information about the ROF mining development.

Ring of Fire regional-framework agreement

Under the Liberal government of Kathleen Wynne, former Ontario premier Bob Rae was appointed as chief negotiator to represent the nine different native governments—Marten Falls First Nation, Webequie First Nation, Neskantaga First Nation, Nibinamik First Nation, Aroland First Nation, Long Lake 58 First Nation, Ginoogaming First Nation, Eabametoong First Nation, Mishkeegogamang First Nation, and Constance Lake First Nation for the Matawa First Nations—in talks with the Ontario government about the opening of First Nations lands to the Ring of Fire development. Noront's Eagle's Nest copper and nickel mine and the Black Thor chromite mine of Cliffs Natural Resources would generate wealth and royalties for Ontario, but the mines are in a remote region. They will "require significant development to make them viable". "[D]evelopment that will have a profound effect on the local native communities, five of which are not yet accessible by road." By 2014, a "regional-framework agreement between the Matawa Tribal Council was the provincial government was reached. Retired Supreme Court justice Frank Iacobucci negotiated on behalf of the province and former premier Bob Rae on behalf of the Matawa, "set the terms for how future projects related to the proposed Ring of Fire would be finalized. It was intended to serve as a model for Crown-Indigenous relations on major resource-extraction projects."

In late August 2019 in Rickford announced that the province of Ontario was dissolving the regional-framework agreement and that this would come into effect in 90 days. Rickford said that, "Frankly, to this point, it’s been a little complicated and lengthy, It has not necessarily met the timelines that the market should expect a project to come on board."

Royalties
By 2013–2014 royalties collected from De Beers Victor Diamond Mine amounted to $226. At that time De Beers was continuing to pay off its "$1 billion investment to build the mine and from now until it closes, the company expects to pay tens of millions of dollars in royalties".

See also
 Plan Nord
 Roads to Resources Program
 Mid-Canada Corridor
 Geology of Ontario

Notes

References

Politics of Northern Ontario
Mines in Northern Ontario
Geography of Kenora District
First Nations history in Ontario
Proposed infrastructure in Canada
Indigenous politics in Canada